Homestead National Historical Park, a unit of the National Park System known as the Homestead National Monument of America prior to 2021, commemorates passage of the Homestead Act of 1862, which allowed any qualified person to claim up to  of federally owned land in exchange for five years of residence and the cultivation and improvement of the property.  The Act eventually transferred  from public to private ownership.

The national monument was first included in the National Register of Historic Places in 1966.

Homestead Heritage Center and Education Center
The Homestead Heritage Center, dedicated in 2007, contains exhibits that treat the effect of the Homestead Act on immigration, agriculture, native tribes, the tallgrass prairie ecosystem, and federal land policy.  The roof line of the center resembles a "single bottom plow moving through the sod," and the parking lot measures exactly . A separate Education Center features science and social science presentations that can be shared with classrooms anywhere in the United States through distance-learning.

Tallgrass prairie
The park includes  of tallgrass prairie restored to approximate the ecosystem that once covered the central plains of the United States—and that was nearly plowed into extinction by the homesteaders. This restoration, which necessitates regular mowing, haying, and prescribed burns, has been managed by the National Park Service for more than 60 years and is the oldest in the National Park System.

Palmer-Epard Cabin

It measures  and is representative of the local construction style. Palmer lived in the cabin with his wife and ten children. Between 1875 and 1880, a  lean-to was added to the rear of the cabin, and the Palmers continued to live in it until 1895, when it was sold to nephews Eugene Mumford and William Foreman. A few years later, the farm was sold to Lawrence and Ida Mumford Epard, who lived in the cabin for nearly 40 years. The cabin was donated to the park in 1950 and has been moved and restored several times in intervening years.

Freeman School

The Freeman School, built of foot-thick red brick with carved limestone lintels, was the longest continuously used one-room school in Nebraska (1872–1967). The school also served as a Lutheran church, a polling place for Blakely Township, and a community center for debates, clubs, and box socials. The National Park Service restored the school to appear as it did during the 1870s.

The Freeman School was the focus of an early, influential judicial decision regarding separation of church and state.  In 1899, Daniel Freeman sued the school board after a teacher, Edith Beecher, refused to stop praying, reading the Bible, and singing gospel songs in her classroom.  In Freeman v. Scheve, et al. (1902), the Nebraska Supreme Court ruled that Beecher's activities violated provisions of the Nebraska constitution.

Administrative history

Daniel Freeman (1826–1908), a native of Ohio, filed the first homestead claim in the Brownville, Nebraska land office on January 1, 1863. By the mid-1880s, Freeman also claimed to have been the first homesteader in the nation. As early as 1884, he first proposed the idea of memorializing himself as the earliest homesteader, and shortly after his death in 1908, Beatrice residents talked of preserving his homestead as a national park.

Proposals to create such a park were rejected until during the mid-1920s, the influential Senator George W. Norris suggested a historical museum of agricultural implements be established on the Freeman property and the local chapter of the Daughters of the American Revolution dedicated a marker there.

In 1934, Beatrice citizens organized the National Homestead Park Association, reinvigorating the movement.  In 1935, Norris and newly elected congressman Henry C. Luckey of Lincoln introduced legislation to create the Homestead National Monument of America, which eventually became law in March 1936.  But federal funding for the purchase was not obtained until March 1938.  Negotiations with the Freeman heirs "dragged on for months over the value of the land," and condemnation proceedings were instigated to bring them to terms. The government took possession at the end of the year.

A few improvements were made to the site before American entrance into World War II effectively ended both visitation and development.  In the 1950s, the National Park Service acquired the Palmer-Epard cabin and built a visitor center as part of its Mission 66 program. A small museum there exhibited some of the artifacts donated to the park by the Gage County Historical Society in 1948.  By 1981 the national monument had five permanent employees, one part-time employee, and some seasonal personnel.

In the 1970s and '80s, seasonal rangers presented living history demonstrations, although many of their activities were later viewed as "not historically accurate for the homestead era" and "more reminiscent of the Appalachian hill country than prairie homesteads."  By the 1990s, the NPS had limited funding for such interpretation, and the monument began to extend the story of the Homestead Act to other regions of the country.  Under Superintendent Mark Engler, a Beatrice native, the national monument dedicated the Homestead Heritage Center in 2007 with more interactive displays that treated the Homestead Act from a broader prospective, a change symbolized in part by a "Living Wall" at its entrance with a physical representation of the percentage of land successfully homesteaded in each state. The monument was renamed to Homestead National Historical Park in 2021.

References

External links 

The Freeman School: Building Prairie Communities, a National Park Service Teaching with Historic Places (TwHP) lesson plan
Groundbreaking Ceremony - NET Television

1936 establishments in Nebraska
Federal lands in Nebraska
Historic American Buildings Survey in Nebraska
History museums in Nebraska
Museums in Gage County, Nebraska
National Park Service areas in Nebraska
National Register of Historic Places in Gage County, Nebraska
Protected areas established in 1936
Protected areas of Gage County, Nebraska
National Historical Parks of the United States